Khon Kaen Sugar (KSL) is a sugar-manufacturing company based in Thailand. Its corporate headquarters are in Bangkok.  Its principal manufacturing facilities are in Khon Kaen, northeastern Thailand.

History
Khon Kaen Sugar was founded as Kwang Soon Lee in 1945 in Bangkok and in 1952 moved to a plant in Thonburi, producing 250 bags of sugar a day. The company spent the next decades merging with and acquiring companies and in 1974 organized itself and its companies as KSL Group. It one of six sugar companies listed on the Stock Exchange of Thailand (SET) and is on the SET50 Index.

Subsidiaries
Other KSL subsidiary companies include Thai Fermentation Industry, which produces Red Spoon brand condiments and is the largest exporter of seasoning products in Thailand; and Chengteh Chinaware Thailand, which produces and trades ceramic giftware.  As of 2003 KSL is working to use waste molasses and bagasse for the production of ethanol and gasahol.

References

External links
Google finance, Khon Kaen Sugar
Bloomberg, Khon Kaen Sugar

Food and drink companies of Thailand
Manufacturing companies based in Bangkok
Khon Kaen
Sugar companies
Companies listed on the Stock Exchange of Thailand
1945 establishments in Thailand
Food and drink companies established in 1945
Agriculture companies of Thailand